Thomas Rusiak (born Erik Thomas Sihlberg 8 November 1976) is a Swedish rapper, hip hop producer, musician and singer. Rusiak's father was the rather prominent Polish jazz saxophonist, Alfred Banasiak. Rusiak was initially a member of the Stockholm-based hiphop group Sherlock and later closely associated with the popular Swedish rapper Petter, with whom Rusiak worked as a producer and occasional supporting rapper. Rusiak launched his solo career in 2000 with several prominent Swedish artists contributing to his debut album Magic Villa, including Titiyo, Teddybears STHLM and award winning producer Christian Falk.

Discography

Solo albums 
Magic Villa (2000) (Peaked at No. 9 on the Swedish album chart on 10 August 2000)
In the Sun (2003)

With Sherlock 
Made to Measure (1997)

Singles 
Hiphopper (feat Teddybears STHLM) (Version of Teddybears STHLM's Punkrocker)
"Whole Lot of Things" Legends of the fall

Selected production credits 
Slick Rick – The Art of Storytelling (1 track)
Petter – P (8 tracks)

See also
Swedish hip hop
Owes 5 million coins

References

External links
Official Website

Swedish hip hop musicians
Swedish male musicians
Swedish rappers
Swedish people of Polish descent
1976 births
Living people